Ford Ranger is a nameplate that has been used on multiple model lines of pickup trucks sold by Ford worldwide. The nameplate has been used for distinct model lines of vehicles worldwide since 1982 from the compact and mid-size pickup category. 

The Ford Ranger debuted as a compact pickup mainly sold in North America since 1982 for the 1983 model year, with later introductions in some South American countries. Between 1998 and 2011, the Ranger nameplate is also used for models that was developed by Mazda for sale outside the North American market. In 2011, Ford introduced the first Ranger based on the T6 platform. Considered a mid-size pickup truck, the model was developed in-house by Ford Australia. In the same year, the North American-market Ranger was discontinued, leaving the T6 platform-based Ranger as the sole Ranger model worldwide. 

For the 2019 model year, the Ranger was reintroduced in North America using the globally-marketed T6 model. It is produced at the Michigan Assembly Plant at Wayne, Michigan. The Ranger is currently slotted below the F-150 and above the Maverick in the Ford North American pickup truck range, while for markets outside the Americas it is typically the only Ford pickup offered for sale. 

The second generation of the T6-based Ranger was released in 2021 for worldwide markets, using the same T6 platform with revisions.

Origin of name 
Prior to its use on compact pickup trucks, Ford used the Ranger nameplate on three different model lines. The Edsel division was the first to use the name, with the Edsel Ranger introduced in 1958 as its lowest-trim sedan; the model line lasted through the 1960 demise of the Edsel brand.

For 1965, the Ranger name returned to use by Ford as a trim package for F-Series trucks; in 1972, a corresponding Bronco Ranger was introduced.  Offered through the 1981 model year, the Ranger trim served as the mid-level to high-level trim package.

Following the 1981 model year, the Ranger trim line was withdrawn from its light trucks, largely in anticipation of its 1983 model year compact pickup truck which was introduced in early 1982.

Americas

North America

Compact pickup (1983–2012) 
For the 1983 model year, Ford introduced the Ranger for the United States and Canada.  The first compact pickup truck designed by Ford, the American-produced Ranger replaced the Mazda-produced Ford Courier.  Produced across three generations using a single chassis architecture, the model line was marketed from the 1983 to the 2012 model years (ending retail sales after the 2011 model year).

The Ranger light-truck chassis architecture served as the basis for a wide range of vehicles over its production.  Along with sharing body and powertrain components with the Ford Bronco II and Ford Explorer SUVs, the Ranger also shared components with the Ford Aerostar minivan and the Ford Explorer Sport Trac mid-size pickup truck.  Through the use of rebadging, from 1994 to 2009, Mazda marketed the Ford Ranger in the United States and Canada as the Mazda B-Series (the reverse of the 1970s Ford Courier and also the reverse of the Ford Ranger outside of North America).

While among the highest-selling vehicles in the compact segment for nearly its entire 29-year production, an overall decline in demand for compact trucks led to its discontinuation after the 2011 model year (a short 2012 run was produced for fleet sales).  On December 22, 2011, the final Ford Ranger produced for North America was assembled at the  Twin Cities Assembly Plant, the final vehicle assembled at the facility.

Mid-size pickup (2019–present) 

For the 2019 model year, the Ranger returned to its model range in North America after an eight-year hiatus to slot below the F-Series. The first example was assembled on October 22, 2018.  The first generation of the model line sold as a mid-size pickup truck, the fourth-generation Ranger is derived from the global-market Ranger T6 designed by Ford Australia with adaptations accommodate US government regulations along with other modifications made to match local market demands.

The current generation of the Ranger is offered in two configurations on a 127-inch wheelbase, including a 2+2 door SuperCab (6-foot bed) and a 4-door SuperCrew (5-foot bed). As of the current model, the two-door standard cab is not offered for sale in North America.

The model line is produced by Ford at its Michigan Assembly Plant at Wayne, Michigan.

South America 

In 1995, exports of the Ranger began to select Latin and South American countries. To accommodate the demand for the vehicle, Ford Argentina commenced local production of the Ranger in 1998, introducing a four-door cab not sold in North America. During the 2000s, Rangers produced by Ford Argentina shared a common chassis with North American-produced vehicles, while offering a diesel engine option to meet local demand. For 2010, the locally-produced Ranger underwent a final exterior revision exclusive to the South American market.

Ford Argentina ended production of the compact Ranger following the 2011 model year to shift its production to its replacement, the mid-size Ranger T6.

International

Mazda-based (1998–2011) 

In 1971, Ford entered the compact truck segment as it marketed the second-generation Mazda B series under the Ford Courier nameplate; the Courier was sold worldwide. For 1983, the Ranger replaced the Courier in North America, but Ford continued to source the Courier from Mazda for global markets into the 1990s, following the development of the B-Series model line. In 1998, Ford introduced the Ranger name on Mazda-sourced pickup trucks, however the Courier name continued through 2006 in Australia and New Zealand.

The first-generation Mazda-based Ranger was produced from 1998 to 2006, while the second generation was produced from 2006 to 2011; the latter was derived from the Mazda BT-50 (which replaced the Mazda B series). These Ranger models were sold in Asia, Australasia, Europe, Africa, and several Latin American markets.

T6 platform-based (2011–present) 

In 2011, Ford introduced the first Ranger based on the T6 platform (codename: P375). Developed by Ford Australia, the T6-based Ranger replaced the American and Mazda-sourced Rangers with a single model, also forming a basis of the second-generation Mazda BT-50. The T6-based Ranger models are marketed worldwide, although it was not marketed in the United States and Canada between 2011 and 2018 model years. The second generation model of the T6-based Ranger (codename: P703) was released in 2021, featuring major changes while riding on a revised T6 platform dubbed as "T6.2".

References

Ranger
Cars introduced in 1982